The kickturn is a basic skateboarding trick. It can be done on any ramp or slope. It is the process of riding up on a ramp or slope and then turning to ride back down.

Process 
To complete this trick you must ride up the ramp with considerate speed. Then ride about halfway up the ramp and push back on the tail end of the board until the deck almost touches the ramp. Then make a 180 degree turn and ride back down the ramp.

Variations 
There can be slight variations of the kickturn depending on the skater's footing. If you are Regular footed you turn left to right. If you are Goofy footed you turn right to left.

Skateboarding tricks